Sir Winston Churchill Provincial Park is a provincial park located in east-central Alberta, Canada, on the shore of Lac la Biche. The park is renowned for its birding and for its old-growth forests. It is composed of a medium-sized former island that juts into the lake, as well as other islands in the lake. A road leads into the provincial park where there are washrooms and campgrounds.

History
Named in honour of Winston Churchill, the park was established on September 29, 1952.

Recreation

Fauna
During the summer and spring, many migrating warblers frequent the park, including Black-throated Green Warbler, Cape May Warbler, Chestnut-sided Warbler, and Blackburnian Warbler. The park also hosts a large colony of American White Pelican located on the "Pelican Islands", a group of small sandy islets in the lake which can only be accessed by boat. Owls also frequent the park including Northern Saw-whet Owl and Great Grey Owl. Other birds in the park include Greater Crested Flycatcher, Double-crested Cormorant, Wilson's Snipe, Lesser Yellowlegs, Rose-breasted Grosbeak, and Sanderling. Amphibians in the park include Wood Frog and Boreal Frog. Mammals that frequent the main island of the park include White-tailed deer, American Beaver, Snowshoe Hare, American Red Squirrel, and Deer Mouse.

External links

Official website of the park from Alberta Tourism, Parks and Recreation
Sir Winston Churchill Provincial Park on the Alberta Environment and Parks website

Lac La Biche County
Provincial parks of Alberta
1952 establishments in Alberta
Protected areas established in 1952